Swanpool is a suburb of Lincoln, England. It was built in the interwar period as a garden suburb.

Archaeology 
An industrial pottery kiln dating to the Roman period was discovered to the northeast of the Swanpool estate and excavated by Graham Webster and Norman Booth in 1945. The kiln produced a wide variety of wares, which were distributed throughout the Roman city of Lindum Colonia and as far as the Humber.

References

Further reading
 

Areas of Lincoln, England
Garden suburbs
Roman sites in Lincolnshire